‘’’’’The Real Fauda’’’’’ is a 2018 BBC documentary film that explores the background reality of the TV Series ‘’Fauda‘’ (‘Chaos’) to find the source of the Israeli TV thriller’s popularity in Arab countries. The documentary was filmed with exclusive behind the scenes access to season 2 of Fauda, and for the first time, real access to the group that the hit series is based on.

For the first time, and in light of the popularity of ‘’Fauda’’, Oren Rosenfeld and Jane Corbin were granted exclusive access to the clandestine operatives and organization of the Yamas. The documentary delves into the secretive world of the real life operatives, and how closely the show mirrors the reality.
The underlying theme is how the Arab-Israeli conflict plays out in ‘’Fauda’’ and the realities of the situation in the region.

The documentary includes interviews with Lior Raz the actor who plays Doron in ‘’Fauda’’ and Laetitia Eido who plays Dr. Shirin El Abed.

References

External links

 

Documentary films about the Arab–Israeli conflict
2018 television films
BBC Film films
British television films
British documentary films
2018 films
2010s British films